Who's the Woman, Who's the Man? (金枝玉葉 2) is a 1996 Hong Kong romantic comedy film directed by Peter Chan and starring Leslie Cheung, Anita Yuen, Anita Mui, Jordan Chan, Theresa Lee, Eric Tsang. It is a sequel to the 1994 film He's a Woman, She's a Man.

Plot
Lam Chi Wing (Anita Yuen) was totally infatuated with Sam Koo Ga Ming (Leslie Cheung), a top pop music songwriter. Unfortunately, she simply could not seem to catch his eye until she hatched an ingenious plan.
Posing as a male singer, Lam Chi Wing slowly gained popular attention – and finally won the heart of Sam (who was wondering if he was gay until he discovered Lam Chi Wing was actually a woman).
However, Lam Chi Wing’s plan has worked a little too well – and now she has become one of Cantopop’s biggest stars!
She is recognized for her talent, winning a prize at a major awards ceremony for outstanding male singers.
Overcome with emotion at the ceremony, she is asked to give a speech – and promptly blurts out that she loves Sam Koo Ga Ming.
The world of entertainment blows up with rumors about the duo’s “gay love affair.”
Meanwhile, matters are complicated yet further when the Cantopop scene’s biggest diva – the gender-bending Fong Yim Mui (Anita Mui) abruptly returns after a decade-long absence. Fong Yim Mui develops a crush on Lam Chi Wing…who is shocked to discover that she is also falling for the charismatic diva!

Cast and roles
 Leslie Cheung as Sam Koo Ka Ming
 Anita Mui as Fong Yim Mui
 Anita Yuen as Lam Chi Wing
 Jordan Chan as Yu Lo / 'Fish'
 Theresa Lee as O
 Eric Tsang as Auntie
 Carina Lau as Rose
 Moses Chan as Auditioning gay man
 Clarence Hui as film director	
 Emil Chau as himself (Cameo appearance)
 Cheung Tat-ming (Cameo appearance)
 Ann Hui as Air stewardess (Cameo appearance)

Accolades

References

External links
 IMDb entry
 HK cinemagic entry

1996 films
1996 romantic comedy films
Hong Kong romantic comedy films
Hong Kong LGBT-related films
Hong Kong sequel films
1990s Cantonese-language films
Films directed by Peter Chan
Golden Harvest films
Films set in Hong Kong
Films shot in Hong Kong
Films with screenplays by James Yuen
1990s Hong Kong films